Mutiny is a 1952 American Technicolor adventure film directed by Edward Dmytryk and starring Mark Stevens, Angela Lansbury and Patric Knowles. The picture was produced by the King Brothers Productions and based on a story by Hollister Noble; the two parties had previously collaborated on Drums in the Deep South.

Plot 
During the War of 1812, Captain James Marshall has to run the blockade of the US coast being operated by the British, in order to collect a war loan obtained from France, which is being paid in gold bullion. His first mate is Ben Waldridge, a former Royal Navy captain who was cashiered by the Navy. Waldridge has his former gun crew along with him and, when they realize that there is gold coming on board, they plot mutiny. Leslie, Waldridge's gold-loving former sweetheart, arrives at the same time.

Cast 
Mark Stevens as Capt. James Marshall
Angela Lansbury as Leslie
Patric Knowles as Capt. Ben Waldridge
Gene Evans as Hook
Rhys Williams as Redlegs
Robert Osterloh as Feversham, gunner
Peter Brocco as Sykes, gunner
Emerson Treacy as Council Speaker
Morris Ankrum as Capt. Radford
Todd Karns as Andrews

Production
The film was the first made by Edward Dmytryk after he gave testimony to the HUAC. The King Brothers signed him in May 1951 (he gave testimony in April). Dmytryk was the first member of the ten to give testimony and it was the first time a member of the Hollywood Ten had been signed to make a film in Hollywood since the blacklist. Congressman John Wood supported the signing, saying that it encouraged testimony.

Filming started on June 20, 1951.

Soundtrack 
 "A-Rovin'" (traditional sea shanty)
 "Sailor's Holiday" (traditional sea shanty)

Reception
The Variety review called it "a routine [box office] grosser. ... Unfortunately, after building so elaborately to stress the patriotic yen of Stevens and his daring in setting out with a lightly-armed boat to get the French gold, the story falls to pieces."

Comic book adaptation
 Eastern Color Movie Love #16 (August 1952)

References

External links 

 

Review of film at Variety

1952 films
1952 adventure films
American adventure films
Seafaring films
War of 1812 films
Films about mutinies
1950s English-language films
Films about the United States Navy
Films scored by Dimitri Tiomkin
Films directed by Edward Dmytryk
United Artists films
Films adapted into comics
1950s American films